(Every player that dressed for the Bandits in the regular season or the playoffs)

A

B

C

D

E

F

G

H

J

K

L

M

N

O

P

Q

R

S

T

V

W

Z